Chandangaon is a village in the Chhindwara district in Madhya Pradesh, India. Chandangaon is 4 km from Chhindwara. 

Villages in Chhindwara district